Chancy is a surname. Notable people with the surname include:

Adeline Magloire Chancy (born 1931), Haitian educator, feminist, and politician
Cholzer Chancy (born 1967), Haitian politician
Max Chancy (1928–2002), Haitian intellectual, labor leader, and political activist
Myriam J. A. Chancy (born 1970), Haitian-Canadian-American writer

See also
Clancy